Cardew is a hamlet in Cumbria, England. It is located southwest of Dalston, south of Cardewlees and east of Thursby.

Cardew House, a 16th-century farmhouse built for the Denton family, is a country house of note and Cardew Lodge, a hunting lodge built for Major General William Henry Lowther, is a country house built in the style of an Indian bungalow.

See also
List of places in Cumbria

References

Hamlets in Cumbria
Dalston, Cumbria